The dark-sided thrush (Zoothera marginata) is a species of bird in the thrush family Turdidae. It is also known as the lesser brown thrush, the long-billed ground-thrush, and the dark-sided ground-thrush. The species is monotypic (lacking subspecies) and is closely related to a number of thrushes in the genus Zoothera, including the long-billed thrush and the widespread scaly thrush. It was described by Edward Blyth in 1847 based upon a specimen collected in Rakhine in Burma (Myanmar).

Description
It has a particularly long blackish bill and the plumage is a contrasting dark brown head with rufous-brown wings. The face has a white loral stripe and a white eyering with a whitish throat and chin. The call is a series of monotone thin whistles.

Distribution and habitat
The species has a discontinuous distribution in the eastern Himalayas, and then a population in the higher areas of Burma, northern Thailand, Laos, Vietnam and the extreme south of China. The species is generally non-migratory but will move down from higher altitudes in winter, and has turned up as a vagrant in Bangladesh. The species is not common anywhere, but is potentially often overlooked due to its cryptic plumage and retiring behaviour.

References

dark-sided thrush
Birds of Bhutan
Birds of Nepal
Birds of Northeast India
Birds of Myanmar
Birds of Laos
Birds of Vietnam
Birds of Yunnan
dark-sided thrush
dark-sided thrush
Taxonomy articles created by Polbot